Moll King may refer to:

 Moll King (coffee house proprietor)
 Moll King (criminal)